This is a list of tennis players who have represented the Slovakia Davis Cup team in an official Davis Cup match. Slovakia have taken part in the competition since 1994.

Players

References

Lists of Davis Cup tennis players
Davis Cup